"Love One Another" is a song recorded by Dutch singer Amber in 1999 for her self-titled album. The track was released in 2000, by Tommy Boy Records, as the album's third and final single. It topped the US dance charts.

Charts

Weekly charts

Year-end charts

Cher version

In 2001, Cher released her own cover of the song in her Believe follow-up album, Living Proof by the Warner Bros, and WEA. In 2003, "Love One Another" and "When the Money's Gone" were released as Cher's third and final American single. "When the Money's Gone" topped the Billboards Hot Dance Club Play chart.

The song also earned Cher a Grammy nomination for Best Dance Recording, but she lost the award to Kylie Minogue's song, "Come into My World."

Live performances
The song is featured on the setlist of her 2002-2005 Farewell Tour, sung as part of the Love Medley on the fifth leg of the tour, only in Europe.

Formats and track listings
These are the formats and track listings of all single releases of "Love One Another".US 2 x 12" vinyl (9362 42496-0) 
 "When the Money's Gone" (Brother Brown H&H Vocal Mix)
 "When the Money's Gone" (Thick Dick Vs Cher Bootleg Mix)
 "When the Money's Gone" (The Passengerz Hypnotic Club Mix)
 "Love One Another" (Eddie Baez Club Mix)
 "Love One Another" (J Star Club Mix)US CD maxi single' (9 42496-2) 
 "When the Money's Gone" (Brother Brown H&H Vocal Mix)
 "When the Money's Gone" (The Passengerz Club Mix)
 "When the Money's Gone" (Thick Dick vs. Cher Bootleg Mix)
 "When the Money's Gone" (Manny Lehman Vocal Mix)
 "When the Money's Gone" (Brother Brown Dynamo Mix)
 "Love One Another" (Eddie Baez Club Mix)
 "Love One Another" (J Star Club Mix)
 "Love One Another" (Friscia & Lamboy Club Mix)

References

External links

Cher songs
2003 singles
Songs written by Rick Nowels
Songs written by Billy Steinberg
Song recordings produced by Rick Nowels
1999 songs
Warner Music Group singles
Songs written by Amber (singer)
Articles containing video clips